The Moth is a 1917 American silent adventure drama film directed by Edward José and starring Norma Talmadge, Eugene O'Brien, and Hassard Short. The film is presumed lost with either the first four of six reels or only portions of two reels held by the Library of Congress.

Plot

Cast

References

External links

 

1917 films
American silent feature films
American black-and-white films
Films directed by Edward José
American adventure drama films
Lost American films
1910s adventure drama films
Selznick Pictures films
1917 drama films
1910s American films
Silent American drama films
Silent adventure drama films
1910s English-language films